The tournament Most Outstanding Player is an annual award given out at the conclusion of the NCAA men's ice hockey championship to the player to be judged the most outstanding. The award has been in effect since the adoption of a national championship tournament for the 1947–48 season.

History
In recent years the award has usually gone to the most outstanding player of the team that won the Division I NCAA Tournament. During the first five years of the tournament the most outstanding player did not come from the winning squad but since 1953 the MOP has not been on the victorious school in only three years (1955, 1960 and 1985). Only two players have been named MOP more than once (Lou Angotti and Marc Behrend), however neither was able to do so in consecutive years. In 1960 the MOP was awarded to multiple players for the first time when it was awarded to three separate people, none of whom played for the National Champion. It has not been awarded to more than one player in a single year since.

The 2020 tournament was cancelled due to the coronavirus pandemic, as a result no tournament Most Outstanding Player was awarded.

Award winners

Note: * Recipient did not play for the National Champion

Award breakdown

References

+
Most Outstanding Player